Katinka is a 1988 Danish-Swedish drama film directed by Max von Sydow and starring Tammi Øst. Based on Herman Bang's novel Ved Vejen (1886) which is included in the Danish Culture Canon, it was screened in the Un Certain Regard section at the 1988 Cannes Film Festival. At the 24th Guldbagge Awards it won the award for Best Film and Von Sydow won the award for Best Director.

Cast
 Tammi Øst as Katinka
 Ole Ernst as Bai
 Kurt Ravn as Wilhelm Huus
 Erik Paaske as Linde
 Anne Grete Hilding as Mrs. Linde
 Tine Miehe-Renard as Agnes
 Ghita Nørby as Helene
 Birthe Backhausen as Mrs. Abel
 Bodil Lassen as Louise Abel
 Vibeke Hastrup as Ida Abel
 Henrik Koefoed as Bentsen
 Kim Harris as Togfører
 Kjeld Nørgaard as Kiær
 Birgitte Bruun as Emma
 Dick Kaysø as Andersen
 Paul Hüttel as Doktor
 Søren Sætter-Lassen as The Lieutenant

References

External links
 
 

1988 films
1988 drama films
1988 directorial debut films
1980s Danish-language films
Films based on works by Herman Bang
Films based on Danish novels
Films directed by Max von Sydow
Danish drama films
Best Film Guldbagge Award winners
Films whose director won the Best Director Guldbagge Award
Swedish drama films
1980s Swedish films